Luca Badoer (born 25 January 1971) is an Italian former racing driver. Badoer has raced for the Scuderia Italia, Minardi, Forti and most recently, Ferrari teams. In addition to his racing duties, Badoer was one of the active test and reserve drivers for Ferrari from 1998 to 2010 and in 2009 stood in for Ferrari's regular race driver Felipe Massa at the European Grand Prix and the Belgian Grand Prix after the Brazilian was injured during qualifying for the Hungarian Grand Prix and his original replacement, Michael Schumacher, pulled out due to injury.

, Badoer holds the record for the most Grand Prix starts (50) and the most race laps completed (2364) without scoring a point, although all of his races before his 2009 comeback came during a period when only the top six finishers scored points. Under the 2010 scoring system, he would have scored 26 points over his career. He nearly achieved a points finish in the 1999 European Grand Prix when a strong drive saw him reach fourth place, but the gearbox on his Minardi failed with 13 laps remaining.

Early career
Badoer was born in Montebelluna, Veneto, Italy. He raced karts in his youth starting in 1985 and scored two wins. In 1986, Badoer drove in the 100cc category to become the karting champion of Venice and became national champion the following year. He won the Italian championship in the 100cc international class in 1988.

Formula Three and Formula 3000
In 1989, Badoer moved to single-seater racing, joining the Trivellato team in the Italian Formula Three Championship driving a Dallara/Alfa Romeo. In 1990 he moved to the MRD Team. Driving a Ralt RT33 Alfa Romeo, he defeated Alex Zanardi and Roberto Colciago to win the final race of the 1990 season and finished 10th in the championship. In 1991 he moved to the Supercars team driving a Dallara 391 Alfa Romeo to win four races in succession, but was disqualified after a technicality concerning his tyres. Badoer finished 4th overall in the championship taking 33 points. In 1992 Badoer graduated to the Formula 3000 Championship, where he was selected to drive for Crypton Engineering. Badoer won four races, including a dominating display at Pergusa where he finished 21 seconds ahead of Emanuele Naspetti. While beating a field that included Rubens Barrichello and David Coulthard, Badoer became one of only four drivers to win the Formula 3000 title at the first attempt (the others being Stefano Modena in 1987, Christian Fittipaldi in 1991 and Jörg Müller in 1996). winning four races en route to the title.

Formula One

1993
Badoer had an offer of a long-term contract with Tyrrell to join the team, starting in the 1993 season. Badoer rejected this offer and signed with BMS Scuderia Italia instead.

In South Africa, Badoer retired after 20 laps due to gearbox failure. In Brazil, Badoer qualified 21st and finished 12th after an incident forced him to pit for a new nose cone. At Donington, he fell victim to a new rule limiting qualifying to the fastest 24 cars (his time was only good enough for 26th). The round at Imola saw Badoer race as high as sixth, but finish seventh. This remained Badoer's best result in Formula One. In Spain, he was unable to finish and at Monaco, Badoer finished the last of the runners. He managed to finish 15th in Canada. At Magny-Cours, Silverstone, Hockenheim and Budapest, Badoer failed to finish, twice to suspension failure. Going into Spa, the Lola team was gaining reliability and Badoer finished 13th. At his home race at Monza he was ahead of Christian Fittipaldi and battled for several laps before the Brazilian hit Badoer's car and eventually finished 10th. At Estoril, Badoer finished 14th after starting last. After the race, Lola did not travel to the races in Japan and Australia after the team announced they were to merge with Minardi in 1994.

Benetton offered both Alboreto and Badoer tests in their cars to see who would partner Michael Schumacher for 1994 but eventually chose JJ Lehto and Alboreto went to Minardi to line up alongside Pierluigi Martini while Badoer became Minardi's test driver.

1995
Badoer took over Alboreto's seat after the latter retired. In the underfunded team using a Ford V8 after a deal with Mugen-Honda fell through, he started with a gearbox failure in Brazil with a good qualifying in Argentina. During the race, Badoer collided with the back of Mika Salo's Tyrrell and hit Rubens Barichello's Jordan later on bringing out the red flag. Badoer did not make the restart, having no spare chassis. His best results were eighth places in Canada and Hungary and ninth in Japan.

1996
In  he switched to Forti Corse to be teammates with Andrea Montermini after Pedro Diniz left to join Ligier. During the season, he was only able to qualify for six of the ten races the team entered. In the 1996 Argentine Grand Prix Badoer was involved in a heavy collision with Diniz, whose Ligier struck him from behind and flipped his Forti upside down. He emerged from the collision unhurt but Argentine safety marshals were heavily criticised for failing to assist Badoer in a timely manner because they feared a fire would break out. At Imola, Badoer had a newer car and outqualified Montermini by more than a second. He finished 10th and the last of the runners. In Monaco, Badoer remained at the back and collided with Jacques Villeneuve at Mirabeau forcing both drivers to retire. He did not qualify in Spain but started 20th in Canada. In France, Badoer started ahead of Eddie Irvine after the Ferrari was relegated to the back. Forti Corse folded after that year's British Grand Prix.

FIA GT Championship
In 1997 Badoer moved to the new FIA GT Championship, driving a Lotus Elise GT1 for GBF Engineering with co-driver Mimmo Schiattarella. Following retirements at Hockenheim and Silverstone, Badoer and Schiattarella finished 20th in Helsinki. The pair retired again at the Nurburgring and Zeltweg and finished 12th at Donington completing 151 laps. A race at Mugello saw Badoer retire with loose bodywork. While driving for GBF, Badoer was hired as Scuderia Ferrari's test driver, a role he maintained until 2010.

Return to Formula One

Minardi (1999)
At Melbourne, Badoer raced as high as fifth at some point until gearbox problems forced him to retire with 15 laps to go. Prior to Brazil, he suffered a testing accident which left him with a broken hand. Stéphane Sarrazin took his seat for the race. He returned for Imola with his hand still causing problems but managed to finish eighth. He suffered from gearbox problems and a spin in Monaco and Spain. In July, Ferrari's number one driver Michael Schumacher broke his leg in an accident at the British Grand Prix at Silverstone. As Ferrari's test driver, Badoer expected to be promoted to the race seat in Schumacher's absence, but the team opted for Mika Salo instead, prompting criticism from former Ferrari driver Jean Alesi, who had himself turned the position down. His best chance to score points came at the chaotic 1999 European Grand Prix, only for gearbox failure to take him out 13 laps from the end when he was running in fourth position; teammate Marc Gené was promoted to sixth as a result (he would finish there to score the point widely believed to be the deciding factor in the 1999 Drivers' Championship, holding off Ferrari's Eddie Irvine after McLaren's Mika Häkkinen had passed him following a car failure that took Jacques Villeneuve out from fifth position). Badoer was so upset he broke down in tears after climbing out of the car.

Badoer overall started 48 races for backmarkers Scuderia Italia, Minardi and Forti Corse between 1993 and 1999.

2000s: Ferrari test driver
 

Unable to find a satisfactory race seat in Formula One after 1999, Badoer focused on his job as the permanent test driver for Ferrari, covering thousands of kilometres at the Mugello and Fiorano test circuits each year. He is credited with making a vital contribution to Ferrari's first Formula One Drivers' Championship win for 21 years in 2000.

At the opening ceremony of the 2006 Winter Olympics in Turin, Badoer demonstrated one of the team's 2005 cars in the centre of the stadium. After the pit crew assembled the car, Badoer revved the engine, and performed several doughnuts, creating a large cloud of tyre smoke and leaving circular black marks on the white platform.

Ferrari (2009)
On 11 August 2009, it was confirmed that Badoer would return to Formula One racing after almost 10 years, to replace the injured Felipe Massa at the 2009 European Grand Prix in Valencia. Massa was injured during the qualifying session for the 2009 Hungarian Grand Prix when a piece of suspension fell from the rear of Rubens Barrichello's Brawn GP car and struck Massa's helmet, fracturing his skull, knocking him unconscious and causing him to crash into a tyre wall. Michael Schumacher was set to replace Massa, but a neck injury Schumacher sustained in a German superbike test earlier in the year forced him to pull out. The BBC reported that Badoer was given the job as a "thank you for his commitment to the team". Badoer's ten years-wait is a little shorter than the ten years and three months between Jan Lammers's appearances at the 1982 Dutch Grand Prix and the 1992 Japanese Grand Prix.

In the first practice session for the 2009 European Grand Prix at the Valencia Street Circuit, where he had never driven before, Badoer came last and was three seconds off the pace of fastest man Rubens Barrichello and 2.5 seconds down on team mate Kimi Räikkönen. He was 1.3 seconds down on Räikkönen in second practice, and 1.9 seconds off in final practice. He qualified 20th and last for the race, with a time almost 1.5 seconds slower than Scuderia Toro Rosso driver Jaime Alguersuari, who was 19th. He was also caught speeding in the pit-lane four times during Friday practice. These offences earned him a reprimand and three separate fines totalling €5,400. Badoer explained: "I am used to a 100kph limit in testing and so when I pressed the speed limiter button at the usual point in the pitlane, it did not give the car enough time to slow to the right speed."

A number of drivers defended Badoer's performance. Lewis Hamilton said: "I think he's done a good job. He's not put it in the wall. He's kept it on the track. It's an incredibly tall order to jump into the footsteps of Felipe Massa. He hasn't even raced for ten years, so I think anyone who has taken that long out of the car is going to struggle, but instead I think he has done a good job just to keep it on the track and bit-by-bit he will catch up". Heikki Kovalainen stated, "I don't know what else you could have expected. Sometimes the tyres warm up, or they overheat or they don't warm up, and it's much more complicated than a few years ago where they brought out tyres that worked straightaway in different conditions. I think that knocks the driver's confidence very easily – if the tyres are not working 100 percent you can't push if you don't feel you have the grip".

BBC commentator and former F1 driver Martin Brundle argued in The Sunday Times that the inclusion of Badoer and Romain Grosjean in the race was dangerous, since new rules that ban further testing until 1 January 2010 mean that they have been unable to gain the experience necessary to race. Badoer had never driven the Ferrari F60 before, having last tested the Ferrari F2008 at the Autódromo Internacional do Algarve in Portimão, Portugal in December 2008. Elsewhere, Brundle stated: "It is surprising to some that Ferrari has not elected to use fellow tester Marc Gené who once stood in pretty successfully at Williams. The problem is that, with the testing ban for 2009, none of the test drivers are really up to speed. I personally would have tried a sharp and fit up-and-coming star of which there are many around". During his race commentary, Brundle suggested that Ferrari should use Massa's absence to give a potential future star a drive.

In racing at Valencia, Badoer became the first Italian to drive for Ferrari in 15 years. 
Badoer made up six places at the start of the race and ran 14th on the first lap before he was hit from behind by Grosjean and spun. He eventually finished in 17th place out of 18 finishers, posting a fastest lap which was faster than both Toro Rossos. Ferrari team principal Stefano Domenicali indicated after the race that Badoer would keep the seat for the Belgian Grand Prix.

At the Belgian Grand Prix, Badoer again qualified last after a spin on his last lap of the first qualifying session. At the start of the race, Badoer avoided the accidents on the first lap and finished in 14th place, last of those drivers to finish the full race distance, despite setting the fastest sector one time of the race. Badoer was replaced by Force India driver Giancarlo Fisichella starting at the Italian Grand Prix, although  over the five remaining races of the season he also failed to score any points. Badoer blamed the negative media coverage of his driving for Ferrari's decision to replace him.

Retirement
At the end of 2010, Badoer retired from Ferrari as test driver and was replaced by Jules Bianchi. He ended his 12-year role at Ferrari with a demonstration of the Ferrari F60, the car Badoer raced in 2009 on a Ferrari-themed day at the Bologna Motor Show on 8 December 2010. He also took part in a forum for Gazzetta dello Sport, where he stated his only regret was that he "was only able to do two races [for the Scuderia]". In January 2011, Badoer drove the Ferrari F60 with a special livery on the ice of the Madonna di Campiglio for his final act with the team.

Personal life
Badoer is married and has two children - Rocco and Brando. In 2017 Brando debuted in the WSK karting series.

Racing record

Complete International Formula 3000 results
(key) (Races in bold indicate pole position) (Races 
in italics indicate fastest lap)

Complete Formula One results
(key)

References

External links

 Profile on F1 Rejects
 Profile on Blue Flags F1

1971 births
Living people
People from Montebelluna
Ferrari Formula One drivers
Scuderia Italia Formula One drivers
Minardi Formula One drivers
Forti Formula One drivers
International Formula 3000 drivers
International Formula 3000 Champions
Italian Formula One drivers
Italian Formula Three Championship drivers
Italian racing drivers
Sportspeople from the Province of Treviso